Burkea is a genus of flowering plants in the legume family Fabaceae, and its subfamily Caesalpinioideae.

The genus contains two species:
 Burkea africana Hook.
 Burkea caperangau Baill.

References 

Fabaceae genera
Flora of Africa
Caesalpinioideae